Spy vs. Spy is a video game written by Michael Riedel for the Commodore 64 and published by First Star Software in 1984. A port for the Atari 8-bit family was released simultaneously. It is a two-player, split-screen game, based on Mad magazine's long-running cartoon strip Spy vs. Spy, about the slapstick antics of two spies trying to kill each other with improbably elaborate traps and weapons.

It was ported to the Apple II, ZX Spectrum, Acorn Electron, Atari ST, BBC Micro, Commodore 16, MSX, Amstrad CPC, Amiga, Master System, Game Boy, Game Boy Color, and Nintendo Entertainment System.

Gameplay

The object of the game is to collect various secret items in a briefcase and exit the building through a door to the airport, either before the opposing player exits or before the timer runs out.  While searching for the items, traps can be laid to take out the opponent (or the player himself, if careless). Each spy has a personal countdown timer which depletes by 30 seconds upon each death.

The arena is an embassy, constructed from a series of interconnected rooms laid out on a grid pattern. Higher levels have more rooms and therefore a larger play area. The spies can engage in hand-to-hand combat (achieved by wiggling the joystick or directional pad left and right or up and down when the spies are in proximity to each other) as well as place traps on the furniture and doors which occupy the playing area. These traps are triggered when a spy searches a piece of furniture or opens a booby trapped door, resulting in a cartoon-style animation showing the subject being shot, blown up, etc., and floating up to heaven as an angel.

Strategy is introduced by limiting the numbers of each trap a spy can use and by allowing the traps to be triggered by either spy. Some pieces of furniture also contain 'remedies' which match up to specific traps; these allow a trap to be defused, but can only be fetched one at a time.

Reception
Video magazine described it as "a rousing action-strategy contest" and praised the game's "excellent" graphics as "befit[ting] a game so rooted in a visual medium." The reviewer also noted that "no one has more successfully captured the original feel of the source nor offered a more satisfying result". Ahoy! agreed in its faithfulness to the original, and praised both the simultaneous two-player and one-player options. Antic called it "one of the most original and clever games for the Atari computers yet". The magazine praised the simultaneous two-player display and concluded, "I cannot recommend this game highly enough." The ZX Spectrum version was rated number 20 in the Your Sinclair Official Top 100 Games of All Time.

Computer and Video Games scored the Sega Master System version 90% in 1989 and 88% in 1990.

The NES version sold 300,000 units in North America.

Legacy
A remake including the original version was released for iOS in 2012, but is no longer available.

Two sequels to the original 1984 game were produced: Spy vs. Spy II: The Island Caper and Spy vs. Spy III: Arctic Antics. The third game was also released for the IBM PC. These kept the basic gameplay while tweaking some core features.

References

External links

Spy vs. Spy at Atari Mania
Video from the C64 version on archive.org

1984 video games
Amiga games
Amstrad CPC games
Apple II games
Atari 8-bit family games
Atari ST games
BBC Micro and Acorn Electron games
Commodore 16 and Plus/4 games
Commodore 64 games
First Star Software games
Game Boy Color games
Game Boy games
IOS games
Kemco games
Master System games
MSX games
Multiplayer and single-player video games
NEC PC-8801 games
Nintendo Entertainment System games
PlayStation 2 games
Sharp X1 games
Split-screen multiplayer games
Video games based on Spy vs. Spy
Video games developed in the United States
ZX Spectrum games
Tynesoft games
fr:Spy vs. Spy